Bill Gates' flower fly (Eristalis gatesi) is a flower fly endemic to Costa Rica named after Bill Gates. Another fly found in similar habitats was named after Gates' associate Paul Allen, called Paul Allen's flower fly (Eristalis alleni); according to Chris Thompson, the describer of these species, both names were in "recognition of [their] great contributions to the science of Dipterology".

See also
 List of organisms named after famous people (born 1950–present)

References

Eristalinae
Bill Gates
Insects described in 1997

Insects of Central America
Endemic fauna of Costa Rica